Mitchell Spinelli is an American pornographic film director and producer. Son of porn director Anthony Spinelli, he has directed films in series such as White Panty Chronicles, All Natural, and Taped College Confessions.

In 1995, he won the AVN Award for Best Screenplay, Video for The Face. In 2003, he founded the film company Acid Rain Productions, which specializes in gonzo pornography. He has previously owned the company Plum Productions. He is a member of the AVN Hall of Fame.

References

External links
 
 
  - directing credits
 Adult Film Database directing credits

American pornographic film directors
American pornographic film producers
Living people
Year of birth missing (living people)